2 Compositions (Järvenpää) 1988 is a live album by composer and saxophonist Anthony Braxton recorded in Finland in 1988 and first released on the Leo label on CD in 1996.

Reception

The Allmusic review by Chris Kelsey stated "Recorded with a septet of Finnish musicians that manifests a pronounced affinity for his music, Braxton's Compositions No. 144 and 145 are given a vigorous, warm, and reasonably tight rendering, of a sort made difficult by the usual lack of rehearsal time and scarcity of appropriate collaborators. The soloists, including and especially the leader, are uniformly excellent, but most importantly, the written parts are realized in a way that does justice to the concept".

Track listing
 "Composition N. 144 / Composition N. 145" (Anthony Braxton) - 70:21

Personnel
Anthony Braxton- flute, sopranino saxophone, soprano saxophone, alto saxophone
Mircea Stan - trombone
Pentti Lahti - flute, soprano saxophone, alto saxophone
Pepa Päivinen - flute, tenor saxophone, soprano saxophone, bass clarinet
Seppo Baron Paakkunainen - flute, tenor saxophone, baritone saxophone
Mikko-Ville Luolajan-Mikkola - violin
Teppo Hauta-aho - bass, cello
Jukka Wasama - drums

References

Leo Records live albums
Anthony Braxton live albums
1996 live albums